is a Japanese biathlete.

Career
Tachizaki competed in the 2010 Winter Olympics for Japan. Her best performance was 44th in the sprint. She also finished 54th in the pursuit and the individual.

As of February 2013, her best performance at the Biathlon World Championships is 15th, as part of the 2012 Japanese women's relay team. Her best individual performance is 18th in the 2012 individual and the 2015 mass start.

As of March 2018, Tachizaki's best performance in the Biathlon World Cup is 11th, as part of the mixed relay team at Kontiolahti in 2011/12. Her best individual result is 4th, in the pursuit at Holmenkollen in 2017/18. Her best overall finish in the Biathlon World Cup is 33rd, in 2015/16.

She serves in the Japan Self-Defense Forces and is married to fellow biathlete Mikito Tachizaki.

References 

1989 births
People from Kitaakita
Biathletes at the 2010 Winter Olympics
Biathletes at the 2014 Winter Olympics
Biathletes at the 2018 Winter Olympics
Biathletes at the 2022 Winter Olympics
Japanese female biathletes
Living people
Olympic biathletes of Japan
Sportspeople from Akita Prefecture
Asian Games medalists in biathlon
Biathletes at the 2011 Asian Winter Games
Biathletes at the 2017 Asian Winter Games
Asian Games silver medalists for Japan
Asian Games bronze medalists for Japan
Medalists at the 2011 Asian Winter Games
Medalists at the 2017 Asian Winter Games
21st-century Japanese women